Music Saved My Life Tour was the eighth concert tour by American recording artist, Mary J. Blige. It was launched in support of her ninth studio Stronger with Each Tear (2009). It began in September 2010 and continued through February 2011. Concerts were held in North America, Europe, Asia and Australia.

Background
Universal Music Group announced Blige's tour on September 1, 2010. The tour was described as Blige venturing back to her R&B roots from her previous festival performances, which focused on a heavy rock sound. Blige states the tour's title comes from her personal viewpoint of music after her battles with drug and alcohol abuse. She further commented:"Music makes us want to live. You don't know how many times people have told me that they'd been down and depressed and just wanted to die. But then a special song caught their ear and that helped give them renewed strength. That's the power music has. I believe there are certain things that God uses to get us out of a bad situation, and I believe music was one of the things he used for me. The first time I heard 'Keep on Moving' by Soul II Soul, I felt like somebody pumped a new spirit in me that made me want to go on. [Without music] I honestly think I would be in a really bad situation. I don't take it for granted. I have no doubt I was born to do this.

Opening acts
Jazmine Sullivan (North America)
El DeBarge (North America)
Miguel (North America)
Lemar (England)
Gyptian (England)
Beatbox Drase (Manchester)
Minmi (Japan)
Mye (Japan)

Set list
 
"MJB da MVP"
"The One"
"Enough Cryin" 
"You Bring Me Joy"
"Be Happy" / "You Remind Me" / "Real Love" / "Everyday It Rains"
"I'm The Only Woman"
"I Love U (Yes I Du)"
"Love Is All We Need"
"Reminisce" (contain elements of "They Reminisce Over You (T.R.O.Y.)") 
"Love No Limit" / "Mary Jane (All Night Long)"
"Good Woman Down"
"Everything"
"All That I Can Say"
"I Never Wanna Live Without You"
"Seven Days"
"Your Child" (contain elements of "The Lady in My Life")
"Deep Inside"
"I Am"
"Sweet Thing"
"Not Gon' Cry"
"I'm Going Down"
"Take Me As I Am" (acoustic)
"No More Drama" 
"I Love You" (instrumental interlude)
"I Can Love You" / "Work That"
"Just Fine"
"Family Affair"
Encore
"Be Without You"

Source:

Additional notes
"I Can Love You", "Work That", "The One", and "Family Affair". were only performed during select dates in North America and Europe.
During the first concert in New York, Blige performed "I'm Goin' Down" with Katlyn Nichol.
During the second concert in New York, Blige performed "Fancy" and "Holding You Down (Goin' in Circles)" with Swizz Beatz and Jazmine Sullivan.
"Stairway to Heaven" was performed during the concert in Basel.

Tour dates

Festivals and other miscellaneous performances
This concert was a part of 2010  Bumbershoot
This concert was a part of Bayfest
These concerts are a part of the Raggamuffin Music Festival

Cancelled shows

Box office

Critical reception
Overall, the tour received praise from music critics and spectators alike. Blige was noted for her positive messages through her performances encouraging women to believe in themselves and know there is something "better" plan for them. Ines Min (The Korea Times) wrote, "A soulful train of songs, including 'Reminisce', was accompanied by her smooth dancing skills before breaking down the stage with the pique song 'Good Woman Down'. The performer shook, jumped and shimmied in perfect motion, spurring the crowd to rise in an emotional fervor." Anthony Langone (The Depaula) continued the praise for Blige noting, "Never have I seen such a venue this alive. The entire crowd was on its feet singing every word. This is a true testament of Blige's star power. The ability to not only command the stage, but all the people in a sold-out venue is no easy task. Blige did it with ease, making it look easy." Jon Pareles (The New York Times) stated, "In her songs Ms. Blige transmutes setbacks into determination; she confronts trouble, she cries, she wills herself to get over it, she finds the next love. Onstage she's a pop star as life coach, preaching sermons in self-esteem with gospel cadences."

Notes

References

External links
Blige's Official Website

Mary J. Blige concert tours
2010 concert tours
2011 concert tours